Irena Kohont is Slovenian singer, especially well known in late 1960s and early 1970s.

In 1965, she won Slovenian most successful competition, Slovenska popevka with song "Šel si mimo" (You walked away). Some other well-known songs of Irena  was Mamaluk, To so bili dnevi, Povabi me na luno kdaj,...

References

Yugoslav women singers
Year of birth missing (living people)
Living people